The Black Sea bleak (Alburnus schischkovi) is a species of ray-finned fish in the genus Alburnus, that can be found in Bulgaria in river Veleka, and Turkey in river Rezovska. The species are threatened due to the drought in their rivers.

References

schischkovi
Fish described in 1943
Endemic fauna of the Balkans
Cyprinid fish of Europe
Cyprinid fish of Asia
Fish of Turkey
Taxa named by Pencho Drensky